Ihar Syarheyevich Yasinski (born 4 July 1990) is a Belarusian professional footballer who plays for Bumprom Gomel.

Career
Born in Pinsk, Yasinski began playing football in FC Dinamo Minsk's youth system. He joined the senior team and made his Belarusian Premier League debut in 2007. He was called to the U-17, U-19 and U-21 Belarus national teams. In 2017, he played for Kauno Žalgiris.

References

External links
 
 

1990 births
Living people
Sportspeople from Pinsk
Belarusian footballers
Association football midfielders
Belarus youth international footballers
Belarus under-21 international footballers
Belarusian expatriate footballers
Expatriate footballers in Lithuania
Belarusian expatriate sportspeople in Lithuania
Belarusian Premier League players
A Lyga players
FC Dinamo Minsk players
FC Dnepr Mogilev players
FC Neman Grodno players
FC Granit Mikashevichi players
FC Naftan Novopolotsk players
FC Belshina Bobruisk players
FK Kauno Žalgiris players
FC Slutsk players
FC Sputnik Rechitsa players
FC Dnepr Rogachev players